The 2008 United States Senate election in Mississippi was held on November 4, 2008. The seat was regularly scheduled for election, unlike the special election taking place on the same day. Incumbent Republican U.S. Senator Thad Cochran won re-election to a sixth term.

Candidates

Democratic 
 Erik R. Fleming, State Representative and nominee in 2006
 Shawn O'Hara

Republican 
 Thad Cochran, incumbent U.S. Senator

Predictions

Polling

Results

See also 
 2008 United States Senate elections

References

External links 
 Elections Division from the Mississippi Secretary of State
 U.S. Congress candidates for Mississippi at Project Vote Smart
 Mississippi, U.S. Senate from CQ Politics
 Mississippi U.S. Senate from OurCampaigns.com
 Mississippi U.S. Senate race from 2008 Race Tracker
 Campaign contributions from OpenSecrets
 Cochran (R-i) vs Fleming (D) graph of multiple polls from Pollster.com
 Wicker (R-i) vs Musgrove (D) graph of multiple polls from Pollster.com
 Official campaign websites (Archived)
 Thad Cochran, Republican
 Erik Fleming, Democratic
 Ronnie Musgrove, Democratic
 Roger Wicker, Republican
 The Real Roger Wicker site critical of Wicker by the Democratic Senatorial Campaign Committee
 Musgrove Facts site critical of Musgrove by the National Republican Senatorial Committee

2008
Mississippi
United States Senate